Clifford Washington Kissinger (February 6, 1874 – January 28, 1938), of Pennsylvania, was a philatelist, known to his friends as Cliff, and to some of his fellow stamp collectors as “the little Napoleon of philately.”

Philatelic organizing
Kissinger was an organizer of stamp clubs in the Pennsylvania area. He was particularly interested in establishing junior stamp clubs so that youth could be introduced to the hobby of collecting stamps. As part of his youth organizational efforts, he was one of the founders in 1891 of  the Sons of Philatelia and then the rival Philatelic Sons of America where he served as its first president.

Cliff also served in various other philatelic societies: he was president of the Southern Philatelic Association, which was later known as the Society of Philatelic Americans. He also served with the American Philatelic Society, especially as secretary to the Publications Committee.

Philatelic literature
Kissinger was also editor and publisher of several philatelic journals, including the Pennsylvania Philatelist and Kissinger's Philatelic Postal Card, the latter publication reportedly dedicated more to his ego than to advancing the hobby of stamp collecting.

Honors and awards
In 1992 Kissinger was named to the American Philatelic Society Hall of Fame.

See also
 Philately
 Philatelic literature

External links
 APS Hall of Fame - Clifford Washington Kissinger

1874 births
1938 deaths
Philatelic literature
American philatelists
Engineers from Pennsylvania
American Philatelic Society